Henry J. Allen may refer to:

Henry Justin Allen, (1868–1950), Governor and U.S. Senator from Kansas
Henry James Allen, better known as Red Allen, (1906–1967), jazz trumpeter

See also
Henry Allen (disambiguation)